David W. Craven Jr. (born  1990) is a North Carolina politician.

Early life and education
Craven was born around 1990 in Randolph County, North Carolina. Craven earned a bachelor's degree from the University of North Carolina at Charlotte.

Career
In 2016, Craven became a board member of the Economic Development Partnership of North Carolina. On June 30, 2020, North Carolina State Senator Jerry W. Tillman resigned from his position, both as a state senator, and as the Republican nominee in the general election for the same position. On July 14, 2020, Craven was selected by the Republican executive committee of North Carolina's 26th Senate district to replace Tillman. On July 17, 2020, Craven was appointed to fill Tillman's vacancy by Governor Roy Cooper. He also replaced Tillman as the Republican nominee. At the time he was appointed to the state senate, Craven served as senior vice president of Fidelity Bank, and as chairman of the Randolph County Republican Party. On November 3, 2020, Craven won the general election to stay in the state senate seat he was appointed to.

Personal life
Craven lives in Asheboro, North Carolina. Craven is President of the Asheboro Rotary Club.

References

|-

Living people
1990s births
American bankers
Republican Party North Carolina state senators
People from Asheboro, North Carolina
University of North Carolina at Charlotte alumni
21st-century American politicians